NGC 120 is a lenticular galaxy of type SB0? pec? with an apparent magnitude of 13.4 located in the constellation Cetus. It was discovered on 27 September 1880 by Wilhelm Tempel.

See also 
List of NGC objects

References

External links 
 

0120
Cetus (constellation)
Lenticular galaxies